Zachary Arthur Claus (born November 1974) is an American basketball coach who was most recently head coach of the Idaho Vandals men's basketball team.

Playing career
Claus played college basketball at both Creighton and Eastern Washington. He also spent a year at Nebraska, but did not appear in any games for the team.

Coaching career
After his playing career, Claus began coaching first at then-NAIA Nebraska Wesleyan as an assistant coach and junior varsity head coach. He moved on to Austin College before two assistant coaching stops in Division I at Portland State and Sacramento State. In 2005, Claus joined Mark Fox's staff at Nevada, where he'd stay for the next 10 seasons under both Fox and David Carter. In that span, the Wolf Pack captured three-straight WAC regular-season titles and made three appearances in the NCAA tournament.

After Carter's firing from Nevada, Claus joined Don Verlin's staff at Idaho. Verlin was placed on administrative leave and subsequently fired from Idaho after the school concluded he had committed NCAA violations, and the school named Claus the interim head coach in June 2019. On February 25, 2020, Idaho lifted the interim tag and gave Claus the full-time job.

Claus was fired on February 27, 2023, after Idaho finished the regular season 10–21. Claus had an overall 28–88 record in four seasons.

Head coaching record

References

Living people
1974 births
American men's basketball coaches
Basketball coaches from Nebraska
Idaho Vandals men's basketball coaches
Nevada Wolf Pack men's basketball coaches
Sacramento State Hornets men's basketball coaches
Portland State Vikings men's basketball coaches
Eastern Washington Eagles men's basketball players
Creighton Bluejays men's basketball players
Basketball players from Nebraska
Sportspeople from Lincoln, Nebraska